Mark Herrier (born October 6, 1954) is an American actor and film director, best known for his role as Billy in the 1980s teen trilogy Porky's.  He graduated from Lompoc High School in 1972.

He has also appeared on M*A*S*H, Freddy's Nightmares, Paradise, Murder, She Wrote, The Practice, and Gideon's Crossing. In 2013, he was expected to star in the film Daddies' Girls, with much of the Porky's original cast, but the film was never made.

Filmography

References

External links

American male film actors
American male television actors
1954 births
Living people
People from Lompoc, California